The discography of Cage, an American hip hop recording artist from New York City, consists of five studio albums, two mixtapes, three extended plays, and three singles.

Albums

Studio albums

Mixtapes

EPs
 Mudbone's Madness  (as Mudbone) (1994)
Weatherproof (2003)
I Never Knew You (2009)

Collaborative albums

With Smut Peddlers
Porn Again (2001)

With Nighthawks
 Nighthawks (2002)

With Leak Bros
 Waterworld (2004)

Guest appearances
Aesop Rock ft. Breeze Brewin - Getaway Car
Cenobites - Hot Crib Promo
Copywrite - With Us/Tower Of Babbel
Debaser - Pedestals
Disciples of Jones - Projekt Zero
El-P - Accidents Don't Happen
El-P - Oxycontin Pt. 2
El-P - Habeas Corpses (Draconian Love)
El-P - Reborn (Jax X Remix)
Felt - Protagonist (Full Clip Remix)
Grayskul - How To Load a Tech
Handsome Boy Modeling School - The Hours
The High & Mighty - In-Outs
N.V.One a.k.a. Judge Doom ft. Wes Restless - Strange Characters
Kid Cudi - "Maniac" from Man on the Moon II: The Legend of Mr. Rager
Matty Carlock - Veins
Porn Theatre Ushers ft. Cage - Balloon Knots
Project Wyze - Jakobz Ladder
S.A. Smash - Smash TV
Slow Suicide Stimulus - Bi-Polar Hi-Rollers
Tame One - Leak Smoke
Yak Ballz ft. Bobby Atlas - Pimped Out
Yak Ballz - Detox
Admiral Crumple - Glass Vials
Castro the Savage - The Gutter
Paranoid Android feat Space, Masai Bey - Beyond and Back/Last House On The Left
Sadistik - Russian Roulette feat Yes Alexander
No Pretense - Self Harmonic
Dead Smoke - The Overcoat
Weerd Science - Holes
XO Skeletons - Lascivious Facts

12-inch singles

CAGE - "Suicidal Failure"
2000 Rawkus Records
Side A
 - Suicidal Failure (Clean)
 - Suicidal Failure (Dirty)
 - Suicidal Failure (Instrumental)
Side B
 - The Weather Report featuring Copywrite (Clean)
 - The Weather Report (Instrumental)
 - Dust VS. Ecstacy (Dirty)
 - Dust VS. Ecstacy (Instrumental)
Album Art - Alex From A Clockwork Orange driving a truck at Cage who is standing on the highway with a city in the background. 
Album Art Reverse - Doctors working  at an operating table.
 - Poem: " Leave my dog: Bootlegs, PS2, and dc To my girl Who left me when she said Pick me or PCP. 
 All my existing Music to e.c. and my Royalties, if any to my Shorty.
 and what ever happens Do Not put me on joints with cats I dont know!!
                            Fuck yaLL"

Produced by DJ Mighty MI for Well Done Berger Productions
All songs written by Cage and DJ Mighty MI
Agent Alex Music (BMI) 1972UNES (BMI)
Figs D. Music.Inc (BMI), Budde Music C/O Bicycle Music Inc. 
Hook on Dust VS. Ecstacy by CAMUTAO
Bass by Vere Issacs
Cuts on Weather Report by DJ DAZE
Recorded at the Muthafu*#in Spot on Lexington
Mixed by Kiernan Walsh & DJ Mighty MI at D&D Studios NYC
Mastered by Duncan Stansbury at Frankford Wayne
Cover art and design by brianlife @ onebox.com
EASTERNCONFERENCERECORDS.COM  CAGEVSALEX.COM  RAWKUS.COM

References

Hip hop discographies
Discographies of American artists
Discography